Robin Haase and Thomas Schoorel were the defending champions, but decided not to participate.

Dustin Brown and Lovro Zovko won against Alessio di Mauro and Alessandro Motti 7–6(7–4), 7–5 in the final and got the title.

Seeds

Draw

Draw

References
 Main Draw

Antonio Savoldi-Marco Co - Trofeo Dimmidisi - Doubles
Antonio Savoldi–Marco Cò – Trofeo Dimmidisì